2012 Denmark Open is a darts tournament, which took place in Denmark in 2012.

Results

Last 32

References

2012 in darts
2012 in Danish sport
Darts in Denmark